The Palace of Nations is the home of the United Nations Office at Geneva, located in Geneva, Switzerland.  It was built between 1929 and 1938 to serve as the headquarters of the League of Nations. It has served as the home of the United Nations Office at Geneva since 1946 when the Secretary-General of the United Nations signed a Headquarters Agreement with the Swiss authorities, although Switzerland did not become a member of the United Nations until 2002.

In 2012 alone, the Palace of Nations hosted more than 10,000 intergovernmental meetings.

History

Buildings used before completion
The Palais Wilson was used until 1936 as the main building of the League. Though the Assembly met in Geneva at the Salle de la Réformation (in a building at the corner of Boulevard Helvétique and Rue du Rhône) from 1920 to 1929, and at the Bâtiment électoral or Palais Électoral (Rue du Général- Dufour 24, later used by IPWA, the Red Cross affiliated International Prisoners-of-War Agency) from 1930 to 1936 as well as for special sessions at the Pavillon du désarmement adjacent to the Palais Wilson, before moving into the Assembly Hall of the Palace of Nations.

Project and construction
An architectural competition held in the 1920s to choose a design for the complex described the project as follows:

The Palace, whose construction is the object of the competition, is intended to house all the organs of the League of Nations in Geneva. It should be designed in such a way as to allow these organs to work, to preside and to hold discussions, independently and easily in the calm atmosphere which should prevail when dealing with problems of an international dimension.

A jury of nine architects was selected to choose a final design from among 377 entries:  Hendrik Petrus Berlage, Victor Horta, Josef Hoffman, Charles Lemaresquier, John James Burnet, Attilio Muggia, Ivar Tengbom, Carlos Gato of Madrid, and Karl Moser.  The jury was unable to choose a single winner. Ultimately, the five architects behind the leading entries were chosen to collaborate on a final design: Julien Flegenheimer of Switzerland, Camille Lefèvre and Henri-Paul Nénot of France, Carlo Broggi of Italy and József Vágó of Hungary. Donations from League members were used in the interior.

Completion (1936)
The Palace constituted at the time of completion (1936), volume wise, the second-largest building complex in Europe after Versailles ( vs. ).

Expansion for the UN
After its transfer to the United Nations, two extensions were added to the building, which considerably increased the size of the usable area of the building. Between 1950 and 1952, three floors were added to the "K" building, and the "D" building was constructed to house temporarily the World Health Organization. The "E" building (or "New" Building) was added between 1968 and 1973 as a conference facility (an additional eleven conference rooms and an extra volume of ), bringing the total number of conference rooms to 34.

In December 1988, in order to hear Yasser Arafat, the United Nations General Assembly moved its 43rd session from the United Nations Headquarters in New York to the Palace of Nations.

Description

The park also contains a 1668 chalet.

Beneath the Palace's foundation stone is a time capsule containing a document listing the names of the League of Nations member states, a copy of the Covenant of the League, and specimen coins of all the countries represented at the league's Tenth Assembly. A medal showing the Palace of Nations with the Jura Mountains in the background was struck in silvered bronze.

The building overlooks Lake Geneva and has a clear view of the French Alps.

Image gallery

References

Further reading

External links

 United Nations Office at Geneva
 Palais des Nations

1938 establishments in Switzerland
Buildings and structures completed in 1938
Buildings and structures in Geneva
Diplomatic buildings
League of Nations
Neoclassical architecture in Switzerland
Office buildings completed in 1936
Palaces in Switzerland
Switzerland and the United Nations
Tourist attractions in Geneva
United Nations properties
20th-century architecture in Switzerland